Si Chiang Mai is a district (amphoe) in the western part of Nong Khai province, northeastern Thailand. It may also be spelled Sri Chiang Mai.

History
Si Chiang Mai district was established by King Setthathirath of Lan Xang Kingdom. It was named after Chiang Mai, the hometown of his grandmother, the former queen of Chiang Mai (his mother was the princess from Lan Na). It was created as a district of Nong Khai Province on 4 August 1958, when it was split off from Tha Bo district.

Geography
Neighboring districts are (from the southeast clockwise): Tha Bo, Pho Tak, and Sangkhom of Nong Khai Province. To the north across the Mekong river is the Lao province Vientiane Prefecture. A basalt plateau is flanked by the Mekong River to the north.

Administration

Central administration 
Si Chiang Mai is divided into four sub-districts (tambons), which are further subdivided into 43 administrative villages (mubans).

Missing number is a tambon which now forms Pho Tak District.

Local administration 
There are two sub-district municipalities (thesaban tambons) in the district:
 Si Chiang Mai consisting of parts of sub-district Phan Phrao.
 Nong Pla Pak consisting of sub-district Nong Pla Pak.

There are three sub-district administrative organizations (SAO) in the district:
 Phan Phrao consisting of parts of sub-district Phan Phrao.
 Ban Mo consisting of sub-district Ban Mo.
 Phra Phutthabat consisting of sub-district Phra Phutthabat.

References

External links
amphoe.com on Si Chiang Mai

Si Chiang Mai